Ameesha Patel, (born Amisha Amit Patel; 9 June 1975), is an Indian actress and model who predominantly appears in Hindi films alongside few Telugu films. She made her acting debut in 2000 with the romantic thriller film Kaho Naa... Pyaar Hai which became critically and commercially successful and won her several awards including Zee Cine Award for Best Female Debut.

Patel rose to prominence with Gadar: Ek Prem Katha (2001), which became one of the biggest hits in the history of Hindi cinema, earning her a Filmfare Special Performance Award. She made her Telugu film debut with the successful Badri (2000).

Patel has also been part of successful films including Humraaz (2002), Kya Yehi Pyaar Hai (2002), Honeymoon Travels Pvt. Ltd. (2007), Bhool Bhulaiyaa (2007) and Race 2 (2013). 

His grandfather Rajni Patel was a lawyer and Indian national congress's politician. A street in Mumbai 'Barrisrer Rajani Patel Marge' was named after him in 1986.

Early life and background
Patel was born in a Gujarati family to Amit and Asha Patel on 9 June 1975. She is the sister of Ashmit Patel and the granddaughter of lawyer-politician Barrister Rajni Patel, who was the Congress Pradesh Committee President of Mumbai. She was born in the Breach Candy Hospital in Mumbai and has been a trained Bharatnatyam dancer since the age of five. Her birth-name is a blend of the first three letters of her father's name Amit and the last three letters of her mother's name Asha.

Patel studied at Cathedral and John Connon School in Mumbai and was head girl for the academic year 1992–93 before heading to Tufts University in United States to study Bio-genetic engineering, which she studied for two years, and eventually switching to Economics.

Patel's career began as an economic analyst at Khandwala Securities Limited after graduation. Later on, she received an offer from Morgan Stanley but turned it down. After returning to India, she joined Satyadev Dubey's theatre group and acted in plays, including an Urdu language play titled Neelam (1999), that was written by Tanveer Khan, upon receiving permission from her conservative parents.
At the same time she plunged into modelling, appearing in several commercial campaigns. Patel has also modelled for well-known Indian brands such as Bajaj, Fair & Lovely, Cadburys, Fem, Lux and many more.

Acting career

Debut and initial success (2000–2002)
Patel's first opportunity for acting came in the form of an offer from her father's schoolmate, Rakesh Roshan, to star opposite his son, Hrithik Roshan, in Kaho Naa... Pyaar Hai (2000). The offer came immediately after she graduated from high school, but she refused the project because she wanted to continue her education in the US. Afterwards, Kareena Kapoor replaced her, but luckily, Kapoor dropped out a few days into the principal photography and Patel was given the opportunity once again during a family lunch. She readily agreed to do the project this time. The role of an exuberant college girl in love, undergoing a tortuous time at losing her lover and rediscovering a more mature relationship gave Patel scope to perform. The film was a smashing success and established Patel as a rising star, earning her awards for Best Debut at a number of award ceremonies. In her second film, the Telugu language drama Badri, she starred opposite Pawan Kalyan. The film was a major success, earning more than ₹12 crore distributor share in India.

2001 saw her appearing in Anil Sharma's cross-border romance Gadar: Ek Prem Katha, alongside Sunny Deol. Patel signed on much before she shot into the limelight with Kaho Naa... Pyaar Hai and was among 22 girls that were screen-tested from 500 girls who came to audition for the film. Patel had gone through a 12-hour audition before she got the part. The film went on to become the top-grossing film of the year, as well as the biggest hit of the 21st century, earning Rs 973 million in India. Set during the Indo-Pakistani War of 1947, it featured Patel as Sakeena, a Muslim girl who finds refuge in Deol's house during the riots, and subsequently falls for him. Her performance was praised, and won her the Filmfare Special Performance Award, as well as nominations for Best Actress at various award ceremonies. Taran Adarsh of IndiaFM concluded: "Despite being one-film-old, Amisha Patel deserves full marks for handling the complex role with elegance. She looks the character she is portraying and impresses with a natural performance." The film was perceived as being excessively anti-Pakistani.

These successes were followed by a series of films that flopped at the box office. In Yeh Zindagi Ka Safar (2001), she played a successful singer who was abandoned by her mother at the time of her birth.

In 2002, Patel had three failures. In Aap Mujhe Achche Lagne Lage, she played the role of Sapna, who is caged in protective custody of her own father. She co-starred opposite Hrithik Roshan for the second time in this film. Unlike their successful pairing in Kaho Naa... Pyaar Hai, the film proved to be a disappointment and resulted in a critical and commercial failure. Patel's performance in the film was criticised by a section of the media, but during an interview she clarified that there was an "error" because the scene explaining that her character is supposed to be asthmatic in the film was edited out not knowing that one shot would make such a difference, thus creating confusion to the viewer about her appearing out of breath, as if she's overacting or crying. Patel's unsuccessful follow-up continued with Kranti and David Dhawan's comedy Yeh Hai Jalwa in 2002. In the same year, she tasted minor box office success with Kya Yehi Pyaar Hai, in which she played a career-oriented young woman who rejects the advances of Aftab Shivdasani's character. Then she found another major success when her last release of the year, Humraaz, became the fifth highest-grossing film of the year at the box office, and her performance earned her a nomination for Filmfare Best Actress Award. The Abbas–Mustan marital thriller saw her playing a character with negative shades for the first time. She played the girlfriend of Akshaye Khanna, who marries Bobby Deol to grab his wealth – but, seeing Bobby's honesty, her character surrenders to him. Taran Adarsh commented: "Amisha Patel is just about okay as Akshaye's lover (first half), but splendid as Bobby's wife (second half). This performance should silence her detractors for sure. Also, she's looked her best with admirable outfits and perfect make-up."

Struggle phase (2003–2006)
During 2003 to 2006, Patel's acting career entered a slump. After the relative success of Humraaz, her string of unsuccessful films followed, and would continue until 2006. In 2003, her only releases were Tamil language film Pudhiya Geethai and the Hindi film Deepak Bahry's Parwana. Pudhiya Geethai was the first and only Tamil film that she ever acted in. Her releases in 2004, Vimal Kumar's comedy Suno Sasurjee, a delayed production since 2000, and her second Telugu language film Naani, followed. That year she also appeared in the music videos for O Meri Jaan and Hai Kasam Tu Na Ja by Adnan Sami.

In 2005, she starred in Satish Kaushik's thriller Vaada, playing Arjun Rampal's unfaithful wife who is followed by her obsessive ex-lover. In her next release, Elaan, she played a TV reporter. She later appeared in Ketan Mehta's historical drama Mangal Pandey: The Rising where she played the role of the soft-spoken Jwala, a Bengali widow who gets rescued from committing Sati by a British commanding officer. Patel was cast as a replacement for Aishwarya Rai under the recommendation of Aamir Khan, who was impressed by her IQ level when he saw her on BBC under the segment of Question Time India in 2003. The film, which saw her in a deglamorized role for the first time, emerged an average earner at the box office. Her other releases that year include Zameer: The Fire Within, a delayed production since 2001, and the Telugu film Narasimhudu, both which failed at the box office.

Patel featured in six films in 2006, all of which failed commercially. She first appeared alongside Akshay Kumar and Karisma Kapoor in Suneel Darshan's musical drama, Mere Jeevan Saathi, a delayed production since 2003. Her second release, Humko Tumse Pyaar Hai, saw her playing a blind village girl who gets stuck in a love triangle after undergoing eye surgery. The production was halted since 2002 due to the passing of its director-producer, until Patel's boyfriend then, Vikram Bhatt, took it upon himself to complete the project. The film had a limited release and failed to perform at the box office with some critics terming it as "outdated." 
In Teesri Aankh: The Hidden Camera, Patel played the role of a mute girl who witnesses a murder. She learned sign language in order to fit the role. She was next cast in Tathastu, based on Denzel Washington's thriller John Q (2002).

Patel's fifth release in 2006, Ankahee, earned her critical praise despite its failure at the box office. The film centred around an extramarital affair with Patel playing a housewife whose husband cheats on her with a model. To understand the mentality of a wronged wife, Patel spoke to her own grandmother who had undergone a similar situation. Diganta Guha from Hindustan Times noted "...it's Ameesha's performance that remains in your mind. She is dignity personified in the film, playing a woman betrayed in marriage, going all out to save it and in the end choosing her own path." Later that year, she appeared alongside Akshaye Khanna and Priyanka Chopra in Dharmesh Darshan's Aap Ki Khatir.

Renewed success (2007–2009)

After appearing in a series of box office flops during 2003–2006, Patel's career prospects began to improve in 2007. Her first release in that year was the ensemble comedy drama Honeymoon Travels Pvt. Ltd.. The low-budget film achieved moderate success at the box office. Patel played the role of Karan Khanna's talkative wife who tries to overcome her husband's gay leanings. Her comic timing in the film was well received. Later in 2007, she co-starred opposite Akshay Kumar in Priyadarshan's hit Bhool Bhulaiyaa as a rejected adopted girl who is accused of trying to disrupt the marriage of her childhood crush.

In an attempt to renew her image, Patel appeared in a bikini item number, Lazy Lamhe, in Kunal Kohli's Thoda Pyaar Thoda Magic (2008). She learned scuba diving for the song that took 15 days to complete. Although the film flopped at the box office, Patel managed to garner attention for her appearance.

Delayed and shelved projects (2009–2011)
After the release of Thoda Pyaar Thoda Magic, Patel signed on to two comedies; Run Bhola Run and Chatur Singh Two Star. However, both films were continuously delayed despite being completed in 2009. She next attempted a comeback by signing on to Rajkumar Santoshi's Power. Patel featured in an ensemble cast which also included Amitabh Bachchan, Sanjay Dutt, Anil Kapoor, Ajay Devgn and Kangana Ranaut, but the film was shelved after eight days of principal photography. Despite repeated attempts to land a starring role, Patel dropped out of several projects due to various reasons.

Following a two-and-a-half-year sabbatical, she made a comeback to the Telugu film industry in a brief role with Parama Veera Chakra (2011) alongside Nandamuri Balakrishna; the film flopped.
In the same year, the long delayed Chatur Singh Two Star saw the light of day after three years. Run Bhola Run remains unreleased following the shutting down of the production company Shree Ashtavinayak Cine Vision, despite the trailer and posters being unveiled in late 2010.

Production and new prospects (2011–present)

On 23 April 2011, Patel hosted an event launching her production company, Ameesha Patel Productions, in collaboration with her friend and business partner Kuunal Goomer. Their debut home production, Desi Magic, was launched at an event on 2 April 2013.

In 2013, Patel returned to Hindi cinema with a special appearance in Abbas–Mustan's Race 2, replacing Sameera Reddy as Anil Kapoor's ditzy assistant. Though the film was critically panned, it emerged a box office success.  She followed it with a starring role alongside Neil Nitin Mukesh in Shortcut Romeo, a Hindi remake of the 2006 Tamil hit Thiruttu Payale. The film opened to mixed reviews and performed poorly at the box office.

The teaser trailer for Desi Magic was launched on 18 December 2014.

In 2018, she played a movie star in the ensemble action comedy Bhaiaji Superhit alongside Sunny Deol and Preity Zinta, a production in the making since 2012. The film was poorly received by critics.

On January 19, 2019, it was announced her debut home production Desi Magic has been complete after six years in the making. However, it remains unreleased due to a legal battle.

In the same year, she entered the reality show Bigg Boss 13 with a twist. She was seen as the maalkin of the house for the first week to give different interesting tasks to the housemates.

As of September 2021, Patel is set to reprise her role as Sakeena in Gadar 2: The Katha Continues, 20 years since its predecessor released.

Other work and media image

Stage performances

Patel performed in a number of concerts and world tours during her career. Her first world tour; The Roshans: Hrithik Live in Concert (2001), along with Hrithik Roshan, was performed across India.
In 2004, Patel took part in a series of concerts in the world tour Craze 2004 alongside Hrithik Roshan, Saif Ali Khan and Lara Dutta.
In 2005, Patel participated in Adnan Sami's world tour Kuch Dil Se… that was performed across the US and Canada from 15 April till 15 May.
In October 2008, she participated in Himesh Reshammiya's comeback concert Karzzzz Musical Curtain Raiser joined by Neha Dhupia, Riya Sen and Amrita Arora. In December 2008, she took part in Akshay Kumar's Christmas Eve show Chandni Chowk to Hong along with Bipasha Basu, Priyanka Chopra, Riya Sen, Aarti Chhabria, Himesh Reshammiya and Punjabi rapper Bohemia as part of a promotional campaign for Kumar's film Chandni Chowk to China (2009). In response to 26/11, many New Year's Eve concerts for 2009 were cancelled, but Patel and Country Club India decided to go ahead with their show because they thought it would be against the terrorists' will.

Humanitarian work
In September 2004, Patel joined PETA, one of the organisations championing the cause of animals, as part of an advertising campaign which highlights the lives of captive animals in a zoo who are robbed of their natural surroundings for the amusement of others. Patel posed as a petrified prisoner in a jail cell to throw focus on the plight of animals in zoos. She said: 

In February 2005, along with other Bollywood stars, Patel performed at the HELP! Telethon Concert raising money for the victims of the 2004 Indian Ocean earthquake. She also took part in the Temptations 2005 charity function in New Delhi on 24 December 2005 at the Indira Gandhi Indoor Stadium in aid of the National Centre for Promotion of Employment of Disabled Persons (NCPEDP), a leading disabled rights' group.

In November 2006, Patel joined an NGO called PlanetRead, which helps people in villages to learn reading through film songs. In October 2007, Patel along with John Abraham and Kirron Kher joined the United Nations Office on Drugs and Crime (UNODC) to curb human trafficking in India.

In the media
Between 2002 and 2005, Patel made an appearance in a number of talk shows such as Rendezvous with Simi Garewal and The Manish Malhotra Show.
In 2006, Patel appeared as the guest judge on the special Valentine's Day episode of the singing talent contest Indian Idol 2.

Patel is frequently cited as one of the sexiest Bollywood actresses. Rediff featured Patel as one of Bollywood's sexiest actresses and top Bollywood actresses of 2001. She was ranked tenth on Rediff's list of 2008's Sexiest Actresses. Patel was also cited by Rediff as one of 2008's Sexiest Magazine Cover Girls. She has featured on the cover of Maxim India three times, as well as other men magazines such as The Man, FHM, and Man's World.

Personal life
In 1999, Patel met filmmaker Vikram Bhatt on the set of their first movie together; Aap Mujhe Achche Lagne Lage (2002), and they started dating since the film's release. Later, it caused a rift between the Patel and Bhatt families with Patel running through a financial crisis after her father used her hard-earned money to resurrect a family business, causing misunderstandings between Patel and her parents. In July 2004, Patel sent a legal notice to her father for mismanaging her accounts and assets amounting to Rs 120 million and demanding the money back. Patel's relationship with Bhatt was often reported to the media speculating on a possible marriage.
In January 2008, the media reported that Patel and Bhatt broke their five-year relationship. Bhatt confirmed the break-up in a conversation with Mid-Day. Shortly afterwards, Patel's parents explained their willingness to reconcile with their daughter and that "everybody is happy about the break-up" but their relationship remained strained. On 12 March 2008, Patel was spotted with London-based businessman Kanav Puri at Wills Lifestyle India Fashion Week. In June 2008, she confirmed their relationship in an interview with Mid-Day: "I did not admit to Kanav sooner because he's very special and I did not want to jinx it. It was too precious for me to talk about it to people. It's almost six months now and now I am feeling secure and now I know our relationship is too strong for anything or anyone to come between us." The media once reported that she married Puri but she denied these rumours.

In August 2009, Mumbai Mirror reported that Patel and her brother, Ashmit, had patched up on the occasion of Raksha Bandhan and were spotted together at PVR Cinemas in Juhu. Although the siblings agreed that the matter is sorted, they preferred not to speak about it publicly.
In December 2009, Patel's mother Asha had revealed they have finally ended their five-year estrangement during an interview with The Times of India.

In September 2010, Mumbai Mirror reported that Patel broke off the relationship with her long-time boyfriend Kanav Puri, to focus on her career. She confirmed it via Twitter.

Controversies
In August 2006, an Air India employee had filed a police complaint, alleging that Patel had misbehaved with her after her companion was not upgraded to first class on the Mumbai-New York flight on 18 August. Patel was on her way to attend India's Independence Day parade in New York. Officers at the police station said Patel could be called in and warned about her behaviour, if charges against her are proved, and would be questioned once she returns from abroad. Later, CISF personnel have corroborated the Air India employees' version of the incident. Once Patel returned to India, she stated that the employees "are only trying to safeguard themselves by filing a false complaint against us." Incidentally, there was also a drunken passenger, who joined in this verbal fight. Afterwards, the organisers of the annual parade sent a written apology and a clarification to Patel and said it had booked two first class seats for Patel and her companion for the Mumbai-New York flight but the booking was automatically transferred from one flight to another, creating confusion.

Filmography

Television

Awards and nominations

See also
 List of Indian film actresses
 List of people from Gujarat

References

Further reading
 Trivedi, Hiten J. In the Pursuit of Happiness. Stardust. 6 September 2011.
 Udasi, Harshikaa. Reasons to smile. The Hindu. 1 June 2009.
 Bharadwaj, Praveena. Who Cares? Shrugs Amisha Patel. Indiatimes.com. June 2002.
 Dubey, Bharati. The Amisha Patel interview. Rediff.com. 17 April 2002.
 Shariff, Faisal. 'Gadar – my heartbeat, my passion, my life!'. Rediff.com. 3 July 2001.
 Verma, Sukanya. 'It's unfair to have just one goal in life'. Rediff.com. 22 November 1999.

External links

 
 

1975 births
Living people
20th-century Indian actresses
Indian film actresses
Female models from Mumbai
Actresses in Hindi cinema
Actresses in Tamil cinema
Actresses in Telugu cinema
Actresses from Mumbai
Gujarati people
Tufts University alumni
Sindhi people
Cathedral and John Connon School alumni
21st-century Indian actresses
Indian women engineers
Zee Cine Awards winners